Karaqi (also as Halaqi) is a township of Akqi County in Xinjiang Uygur Autonomous Region, China. Located in the southwest of the county, it covers an area of 2,929 kilometres with a population of 8,010 (2010 Census), the main ethnic group is Kyrgyz. The township has a community, 3 administrative villages (as of 2018) and 8 unincorporated villages under jurisdiction, its seat is at Karaqi Village.

The name of Karaqi was from the Kyrgyz language, meaning   dark green achnatherum calamagrostis. The township is located in the southwest of the county, 45 kilometers west of the county seat Akqi Town.

History
It was formerly part of the 2nd district in 1950 and the 3rd district in 1954, Karaqi Commune was established in 1958, and renamed to Fanxiu Commune, Karaqi Commune in 1978. It was organized as a township in 1984.

Administrative divisions
 Tuanjielu Community
 Karaqi Village 
 Bulung Village 
 Akqi Village

Overview
The township is located in the southwest of the county. Animal husbandry is its main industry,  combined with agriculture. There are about 80,000 livestock all year round, the main crops are wheat, hemp and rapeseed. The provincial road S306 passes through the township.

References 

Township-level divisions of Akqi County